Vernon Hodge is an Anguillan professional football manager.

Career
In 2003–2004 and since 2005 until 2007 he coached the Anguilla national football team.

References

External links
Profile at Soccerway.com
Profile at Soccerpunter.com

Year of birth missing (living people)
Living people
Anguillan football managers
Anguilla national football team managers
Place of birth missing (living people)